Shiden (紫電) may refer to:

Military
a World War II Japanese seaplane fighter aircraft, the Kawanishi N1K-J

Vehicles
Shiden 77, a 1977 Japanese race car
Shiden MC/RT-16, the Mooncraft/Riley, a Japanese 2006 Super GT racer